Bertil Stefan Melander (born 23 November 1957 in Spånga, Stockholm County) is a Swedish harness racing horse trainer and driver based at Åby-Farm in Enköping, Sweden.

Among the horses he has trained are top trotters Scarlet Knight, Iceland, Gigant Neo and Nuncio. Together with these and other horses, Melander has won numerous major races, including Elitloppet (two times), Hambletonian Stakes (once) and Prix d'Amérique (once). When he won Hambletonian Stakes at Meadowlands Racetrack with Scarlet Knight in August 2001 Melander became the first horseman to bring a U.S.-breed trotter trained and developed in Europe to the U.S. and win the Hambletonian.

References

External links

Stall TZ: Official site
Stefan Melander's Profile at Svensk Travsport
Harnesslink: Stefan Melander

1957 births
Living people
Sportspeople from Stockholm
Swedish harness racers